Hans Beirer (23 June 1911, in Wiener Neustadt – 24 June 1993, in Berlin) was an Austrian heldentenor and Kammersänger. He was a regular company member at the Deutschen Oper Berlin, Wiener Staatsoper and Hamburgischen Staatsoper and is best known internationally as an interpreter of the work of Wagner.

While Beirer never appeared at the Metropolitan Opera, he sang with the New York City Opera, in 1950, in Die Meistersinger and Aida.

He appeared in Götz Friedrich's films of Salome (1974) and Elektra (1981).

Sources
 K. J. Kutsch and Leo Riemens: Großes Sängerlexikon, K. G. Saur Verlag, München 1999/2000, 

1911 births
1993 deaths
People from Wiener Neustadt
Austrian operatic tenors
University of Music and Performing Arts Vienna alumni
Österreichischer Kammersänger
20th-century Austrian male opera singers
Burials at the Waldfriedhof Zehlendorf